Dobrynya Nikitich (Op. 22) is a 1901 opera by Aleksandr Grechaninov. It is described as a "Opera-Legend" based on the bogatyr Dobrynya Nikitich. The opera opened at the Bolshoi Theatre on October 14, 1903, with Fyodor Chaliapin in the lead.

Recordings
Excerpts were recorded by the Leningrad Radio Choir and Russian balalaika orchestra 'Vasiliy Andreev' under Georgy Doniyakh in 1959, with Viktor Morozov (bass) Matvej Gavrilkin (tenor) Aleksandra Meshcheryakova (mezzo-soprano) and Lyudmila Grudina (mezzo-soprano).

See also
 Dobrynya Nikitich (1818) by Aleksandr Shakhovskoi

References

Russian-language operas
1901 operas
Operas
Operas set in Russia